1+1 Ukraine is an all-Ukrainian TV channel. Part of the media conglomerate "1+1 Media", whose owners are Ihor Kolomoiskyi and Ihor Surkis.

History 
On December 15, 2022, the National Council of Ukraine on Television and Radio Broadcasting reissued the license for the international channel 1+1 International , changing its name to "1+1 Ukraine". The content of the updated TV channel will consist of "1+1 programs, films and series.

In December 22, the National Council issued a temporary permit for broadcasting "1+1 Ukraine" during the period of martial law in Ukraine for broadcasting in the MX-2 multiplex of the DVB-T2 digital broadcast network for a period of one year.

The TV channel started broadcasting on December 24.

Presenters 
 Alla Mazur
 Natalia Moseychuk
 Ruslan Senichkin
 Lyudmyla Barbir
 Nelya Shovkoplyas
 Egor Gordeev
 Yuriy Gorbunov
 Kateryna Osadcha
 Timur Miroshnychenko
 Vira Kekelia
 Valentina Khamayko
 Olexandr Popov
 Olexiy Sukhanov

Notes 

Ukrainian-language television stations in Ukraine
1+1 Media Group